Taufer is a surname. Notable people with the surname include:

Mel Taufer (born 1998), Ethiopian-born Italian footballer
Michela Taufer (born 1971), Italian American computer scientist
Veno Taufer (born 1933), Slovenian poet, essayist, translator, and playwright